is a Japanese middle-distance runner. He competed in the men's 3000 metres steeplechase at the 1964 Summer Olympics.

References

1939 births
Living people
Place of birth missing (living people)
Japanese male middle-distance runners
Japanese male steeplechase runners
Olympic male steeplechase runners
Olympic athletes of Japan
Athletes (track and field) at the 1964 Summer Olympics
Asian Games silver medalists for Japan
Asian Games medalists in athletics (track and field)
Athletes (track and field) at the 1962 Asian Games
Medalists at the 1962 Asian Games
Universiade silver medalists for Japan
Universiade medalists in athletics (track and field)
Medalists at the 1959 Summer Universiade
Japan Championships in Athletics winners
20th-century Japanese people